Misyulya is a surname. Notable people with the surname include:

 Yevgeniy Misyulya (born 1964), Belarusian race walker
 Natalya Misyulya (born 1966), Belarusian race walker, wife of Yevgeniy
 Nikita Misyulya (born 1990), Russian racing driver